Donald ("Don" or "Donnie") Gay (born September 18, 1953) is an American former professional rodeo cowboy who specialized in bull riding. He won eight Professional Rodeo Cowboys Association (PRCA) bull riding world championships, a record as of 2022. His father, Neal Gay, was a well-known rodeo competitor and later rodeo producer and stock contractor. Don was inducted into the ProRodeo Hall of Fame in 1979; Neal was inducted in 1993, becoming the only father and son to receive that honor. In 2015, Don was inducted into the Bull Riding Hall of Fame.

Early life
Don Gay was born on September 18, 1953, in Mesquite, Texas, to Neal Gay and Evelyn "Cookie" Foster. He was only a year old when his mother died of leukemia. Don's father then married Kay Gay, who raised Don and his brother Pete as her own. Don grew up in Mesquite, Texas, and started competing in rodeos at age six. His father ran the Mesquite Rodeo, which still operates today. He used Mesquite to perfect his skills on both bulls and broncs.

Rodeo career
Gay received his PRCA permit shortly after graduating from high school and began traveling the rodeo circuit. He soon received his pilot's license and began flying himself to rodeo events in a private plane.  Don Gay won almost every major rodeo in the country at some point during his career. He won the first of eight world titles in 1974. He went on to win in 1975, 1976, and 1977. His next four titles came in 1979, 1980, 1981, and 1984. The record of eight world titles in bull riding still stands. 
He qualified for the National Finals Rodeo (NFR) 13 times (1972 to 1982, then 1984 to 1985). Don retired from professional rodeo in 1989.

After rodeo career 
Since 2002, Gay has been the general manager of Frontier Rodeo Company, providing livestock to professional rodeos and bull riding events across the United States. He also does live announcing at a number of them. He has also done commentary for televised rodeo and bull riding events. From the 1980s to 2000s, Gay was a commentator for the Mesquite Championship Rodeo when the weekly event was televised. He also provided commentary for Professional Bull Riders  big-league events on TNN from 1993 to 2001, PRCA Xtreme Bulls big-league events on ESPN from 2003 to 2010 and GAC Family (GAC) from 2011 to 2013, Toughest Cowboy on Fox Sports Networks (FSN) from 2007 to 2008, and Championship Bull Riding  big-league events on GAC from 2009 to 2010. From 2003 to 2017 and again since 2020, Gay has provided commentary for the bull riding during the live telecasts of the National Finals Rodeo each December,  and in 2018, he provided commentary for the Tuff Hedeman Bull Riding Tour (TBHRT) on The Cowboy Channel. Starting in 2011, he began running his own semi-professional bull riding organization, the Don Gay Bull Riding Tour, which sanctioned events in some southern U.S. states. In 2016, this organization was renamed the Rank Bull Rider Tour. After its 2017 finals event, the Rank Bull Rider Tour became defunct.

Legacy 
Don was inducted into the ProRodeo Hall of Fame in 1979; his father Neal was inducted in 1993, becoming the only father and son to receive this honor. In 1997, he received the PBR Ring of Honor. In 2015, Don was inducted into the Bull Riding Hall of Fame. In 2007, Gay was inducted into the Texas Rodeo Cowboy Hall of Fame along with his brothers Pete and Jim. In 2006, the ProRodeo Hall of Fame created the Legends of ProRodeo award which is awarded annually. Again, Don and his father Neal are the only two son and father combo to receive this award. Don received it in 2013, and Neal received it in 2016. The award is given to individuals who have retired from participating in the sport of rodeo but have tirelessly continued to contribute to the sport afterwards.

Honors 
 1979 ProRodeo Hall of Fame
 1996 Texas Sports Hall of Fame
 1997 PBR Ring of Honor
 2000 Texas Cowboy Hall of Fame
 2007 Texas Rodeo Cowboy Hall of Fame
 2008 Rodeo Hall of Fame of the National Cowboy and Western Heritage Museum
 2013 Legends of ProRodeo
 2015 Molalla Walk of Fame
 2015 Bull Riding Hall of Fame

References

External links
 Professional Rodeo Cowboys Association - Official Web Site
 THE OFFICIAL SITE OF THE MESQUITE CHAMPIONSHIP RODEO Mesquite Championship Rodeo  - Official Web Site
 ProRodeo Hall of Fame
 Professional Bull Riders, Inc.
 Texas Rodeo Cowboy Hall of Fame
 "No Guts, No Glory", September 6, 1982, accessed December 3, 2016
 Don Gay: Bull Riding Champion Quiz accessed December 3, 2016
 "Rodeo Classics" - Donny Gay Maestro Gaxiola accessed December 3, 2016

1953 births
American color commentators
Bull riders
Living people
People from Mesquite, Texas
Professional Bull Riders: Heroes and Legends
ProRodeo Hall of Fame inductees
Rodeo announcers